Ateleaspis is an extinct genus of primitive ostracoderm fish that lived in the Silurian period (Wenlock Epoch) to the Lower Devonian. Like other ostracoderms, Ateleaspis had a head shield similar to that of Cephalaspis. Species from Silurian period were found in Norway and Scotland, but now has been found also in Siberia from Early Devonian period.

Description
Ateleaspis possibly is the most basal vertebrate with paired fins. Ateleaspis was a small fish (about 15 – 20 cm) and had a flat headshield and a narrow trunk covered by brick-like scales.

References

External links 
 Ateleaspis at Palaeos
 Ateleaspis species location & chronology

Osteostraci genera
Paleozoic jawless fish
Fossils of Norway
Fossils of Great Britain